Huff Hills Ski Area is a ski resort located sixteen miles south of Mandan, North Dakota.  It was established in 1993 on the former site of the defunct Twilight Hills ski area, which operated during the 1960s.

Description
21 runs
425 ft. vertical
3 lifts - 2 double chairlifts, handle tow
Snowmaking
Ski and snowboard ready and

Lifts
Huff Hills began operation with a chairlift acquired from Buffalo, New York's Holimont ski resort and a t-bar lift.  Two years later, the resort purchased a Hall 1405 chairlift that had been the first chair used at Brian Head Ski Resort in southwestern Utah.

References

External links
Huff Hills website

Buildings and structures in Morton County, North Dakota
Ski areas and resorts in North Dakota
Tourist attractions in Morton County, North Dakota
Mandan, North Dakota